Katie or Kate Moore may refer to:

Katie Moore (singer-songwriter), Canadian singer-songwriter
Katie Moore (model) (born 1997), American fashion model
Kathleen Moore (1812–1899), American lighthouse keeper
 Kate Moore (composer) (born 1979), Australian composer
 Kate Gordon Moore (1878–1963), American psychologist
Katy Moore, character on the American television series The Office